Asota kageri is a moth of the family Erebidae first described by Kobes in 1988. It is found on Borneo and Sumatra.

The wingspan is 29–31 mm.

References

Asota (moth)
Moths of Asia
Moths described in 1988